Benigno Andrade Flores (9 January 1892 – 22 June 1972) was chairman of military junta of Ecuador in September 1935.

References

Presidents of Ecuador
1892 births
1972 deaths